B9, B IX or B-9 may refer to:

Science
 Prodelphinidin B9, a plant phenolic compound
 Vitamin B9, another name for folic acid
 B-Nine WSG, a formulation of the plant growth regulator daminozide
 Boron-9 (B-9 or 9B), an isotope of boron
 A subclass of B-class stars

Transport
 B9 (Croatia), a road part of the Istrian Y highway complex
 B9 (New York City bus) serving Brooklyn
 Bundesstraße 9, a federal highway in Germany
 Iran Airtour (IATA code B9)
Air Bangladesh (former IATA code B9)

Vehicles
 Bavarian B IX, an 1874 German steam locomotive model
 Bavarian B IX (Ostbahn), an 1869 German steam locomotive model
 Bensen B-9, a 1958 American small helicopter
 Boeing B-9 (sometimes referred to as the Y1B-9 or YB-9), a 1931 United States Army Air Corps bomber
 , a British Royal Navy B-class submarine
 LNER Class B9, a class of British steam locomotives 
 The former model name for the Subaru Tribeca

Organizations
 The abbreviation used for the record label Bridge Nine
 Bucharest Nine (B9), a group of nine NATO members: Bulgaria, the Czech Republic, Estonia, Hungary, Latvia, Lithuania, Poland, Romania and Slovakia

Other uses
 Iceberg B-9, a 1987 iceberg calved away from Antarctica
 Model B-9 on the TV series Lost in Space, otherwise known simply as “Robot (Lost in Space)“
 An international standard paper size (44×62 mm), defined in ISO 216

See also
 9B (disambiguation)